The Amherst News - Citizen Record is a weekly newspaper serving Cumberland County, Nova Scotia. The paper was launched in 2013 when two weekly community papers, Amherst News and Citizen Record were merged replacing the daily newspaper The Amherst Daily News. It has a circulation of under 3,828. Its sister weekly publication is the Springhill Record.

References

2013 establishments in Nova Scotia
Amherst, Nova Scotia
Newspapers established in 2013
SaltWire Network publications
Weekly newspapers published in Nova Scotia